Ben Kavanagh (born 4 March 1988) is a Scotland international rugby league footballer who plays as a  for Halifax in the Betfred Championship.

Background
Kavanagh was born in Halifax, West Yorkshire, England.

Career
Kavanagh initially joined Widnes on loan from Wigan in 2008. He scored two tries in 21 appearances for the Widnes club, and joined the club permanently at the end of the season, signing a three-year contract. He went on to make 72 consecutive appearances for the club, and was the first player to be given a Super League contract by Widnes when they were granted a licence for the 2012 season.

Kavanagh is a Scotland international, and was named in their squad for the 2013 Rugby League World Cup as a replacement for the injured Keith Galloway.

On 7 May 2014, Kavanagh committed to playing for Widnes for two more years.

In October and November 2014, Kavanagh played in the 2014 European Cup competition. He played in all of Scotland's games and scored a try in their fixture against France.  In October and November 2015, Kavanagh played in the 2015 European Cup competition.  Kavanagh signed a two-year Deal with the Bradford Bulls following the 2015 season.  Kavanagh featured in the pre-season friendlies against Leeds Rhinos and Castleford Tigers.  In January 2017, it was revealed that Kavanagh had signed a two-year deal to play for Hull Kingston Rovers.  In 2019, he joined Halifax.  In September 2020, he signed a one-year contract extension with Halifax.

References

External links
Hull Kingston Rovers profile

Profile at rugby.widnes.tv
2017 RLWC profile
SL profile

1988 births
Living people
Bradford Bulls players
English people of Scottish descent
English rugby league players
Halifax R.L.F.C. players
Hull Kingston Rovers players
Rugby league props
Scotland national rugby league team players
Rugby league players from Halifax, West Yorkshire
Wakefield Trinity players
Widnes Vikings players